was a district located in Yamanashi Prefecture, Japan.

As of March 2006, the district has an estimated population of 513. The total area is 37.15 km2.

On the day before the district dissolved (July 31, 2006), the district had only one village left:
 Ashigawa

On August 1, 2006, the village of Ashigawa was merged into the expanded city of Fuefuki. Therefore, Higashiyatsushiro District was dissolved as a result of this merger.

District Timeline
 1878 - The district was founded after Yatsushiro District was split into Higashiyatsushiro and Nishiyatsushiro Districts.
 On October 12, 2004 - the towns of Ichinomiya, Isawa, Misaka and Yatsushiro, and the village of Sakaigawa were merged with the town of Kasugai (from Higashiyamanashi District) to create the city of Fuefuki.
 On February 20, 2006 - the village of Toyotomi was merged with the towns of Tamaho and Tatomi (both from Nakakoma District) to create the city of Chūō.
 On March 1, 2006 - the town of Nakamichi was merged into the expanded city of Kōfu.
 On August 1, 2006 - the village of Ashigawa was merged into the expanded city of Fuefuki. Higashiyatsushiro District was dissolved as a result of this merger.

Former districts of Yamanashi Prefecture